Pukë is a town and municipality in northern Albania. It was formed at the 2015 local government reform by the merger of the former municipalities Gjegjan, Pukë, Qelëz, Qerret and Rrapë, that became municipal units. The seat of the municipality is the town Pukë. The total population is 11,069 (2011 census), in a total area of 505.83 km2. The population of the former municipality at the 2011 census was 3,607. 

At 838 metres above sea level, the town is one of the highest in elevation in Albania and a well-known ski area. It is 150 km from Albania's capital, Tirana.

Etymology 
The toponym may derive from Latin via publica ("public road") as it was located on an old trade route.

History
The settlement is inhabited by the tribe of Puka, itself one of the "seven tribes of Puka".

In the 20th century, Pukë was expanded as a military base and a centre of Catholic education. The distinguished Albanian poet Migjeni taught in the town from 1936 to 1937. 

Pukë is surrounded by a 400-hectare (1.5 sq mi) pine-coated massif. 

As in other parts of Europe, climate change has extended and consolidated the range of the pine processionary moths, who defoliate pines, including in the pinelands of northern Albania.

Economy
The hotel standing in the town square has been upgraded and now boasts a microbrewery producing Puka Beer, which is a lager in draught form. The local football club is KF Tërbuni Pukë.

Mayors

Notable people
Etilda Gjonaj - Albanian politician, lawyer, and professor. She is currently the Minister of Justice of Albania
Altin Lala - Former captain of Albania national football team and Hannover 96
Kristjan Sokoli - NFL player
Xhovalin Delia - Painter
Fabio Gjonikaj - footballer
Taulant Marku - footballer
Sebino Plaku - footballer
Flavio Prendi - footballer
Shtjefën Gjeçovi - Catholic priest, folklorist and the collector and writer of Kanuni i Lekë Dukagjinit/Kanun (Albania)
Ndoc Mark Gega - Patriot
Millosh Gjergj Nikolla - Teacher, poet and writer

Twin towns – sister cities

Pukë is twinned with:
 Signa, Italy

See also
Berishe
Dardhe, Korce
List of mayors of Pukë
List of ski areas and resorts in Europe

References

Sources

 Through The Embers of Chaos  (2002), Dervla Murphy
The author refers to processionary disease in Pukë on a cycle trip through Albania, including a stay in the town, described on page 213

External links

Official website
Hotel Turizem Puka Official Website
Pukë A Web page dedicated to Pukë and the surrounding area
Puka Tourist Guide

 
Municipalities in Shkodër County
Ski areas and resorts in Albania
Administrative units of Pukë
Towns in Albania